Bashundhara can refer to:

 Bashundhara Group, one of the largest industrial conglomerates of Bangladesh
 Bashundhara City, shopping mall in Dhaka, the second largest shopping mall in Bangladesh 
 Bashundhara Residential Area, Private residential area of Badda Thana in Dhaka District in the Division of Dhaka, Bangladesh
 Bashundhara Bangladesh Open,  golf tournament on the Asian Tour
 Islamic Research Center Bangladesh, known as Bashundhara Islamic Research Center
 Basundhara, 2010 Assamese drama film